This is a list of seasons completed by the Gonzaga Bulldogs men's basketball team since the team's formation in 1907. They have been conference regular season champions 25 times and conference tournament champions 17 times. They have also appeared in 22 NCAA basketball tournaments, playing in the Round of 64 in each appearance, reaching the Round of 32 a total of 18 times, the Sweet Sixteen 10 times, the Elite Eight four times, and the Final Four twice. They played in their first NCAA national championship game in 2017, losing to North Carolina, and played in their second against Baylor in 2021.

The Gonzaga men's basketball season-by-season results are sourced from the official Gonzaga and Big Sky record books as of February 28, 2021.

Seasons

References

 
Gonzaga
Gonzaga Bulldogs basketball seasons